Carey Bell Harrington (November 14, 1936 – May 6, 2007) was an American blues musician who played harmonica in the Chicago blues style. Bell played harmonica and bass guitar for other blues musicians from the late 1950s to the early 1970s before embarking on a solo career. Besides his own albums, he recorded as an accompanist or duo artist with Earl Hooker, Robert Nighthawk, Lowell Fulson, Eddie Taylor, Louisiana Red and Jimmy Dawkins and was a frequent partner with his son, the guitarist Lurrie Bell. Blues Revue called Bell "one of Chicago's finest harpists." The Chicago Tribune said Bell was "a terrific talent in the tradition of Sonny Boy Williamson and Little Walter."

Career

Early life
Bell was born Carey Bell Harrington in Macon, Mississippi. As a child, he was intrigued by the music of Louis Jordan and wanted a saxophone to be like his hero Jordan. His family could not afford one, so he had to settle for a harmonica, colloquially known as a "Mississippi saxophone". Soon Bell was attracted by the blues harmonica greats—DeFord Bailey, Big Walter Horton, Marion "Little Walter" Jacobs, Sonny Boy Williamson I and Sonny Boy Williamson II—and taught himself to play. By the time he was eight, he was proficient on the instrument. When he was thirteen, he joined the blues band of his godfather, the pianist Lovie Lee.

Chicago
In September 1956, Lee persuaded Bell to go with him to Chicago. Not long after arriving, Bell went to the Club Zanzibar, where Little Walter was appearing. Bell met Walter and later learned some harp playing from him and from Big Walter Horton, his main Chicago teacher. To help further his chances of employment as a musician, he learned how to play the electric bass from Hound Dog Taylor.

Having learned from some of the greatest blues harp players of the genre, Bell arrived in Chicago at an unfortunate time. The demand for harp players was decreasing there, as the electric guitar became the prominent blues instrument. To pay the bills, he joined several bands as a bassist. In the late 1960s, he performed regularly on the West Side of Chicago with the guitarists Eddie Taylor and Royal Johnson, playing harmonica and bass. In 1969, Bell toured Europe with the American Folk Blues Festival and played at the Royal Albert Hall in London, appearing on a live recording of the event.

Debut through 1980s
In 1969, Delmark Records in Chicago released Bell's debut album, Carey Bell's Blues Harp. He played with Muddy Waters in late 1970 and 1971 and later with Willie Dixon's Chicago Blues All-Stars. In 1972, Bell teamed up with Big Walter in the studio and recorded Big Walter Horton with Carey Bell for Alligator Records. A year later Bell released a solo project, Last Night, for BluesWay. He continued to play with Dixon and with his own groups. In 1978, he was featured on the Grammy-nominated album Living Chicago Blues, released by Alligator. Also in the 1970s, he contributed to two recordings by the Bob Riedy Blues Band.

During the 1980s Bell continued to record for various labels and to tour. In 1990, he teamed up with fellow harpists Junior Wells, James Cotton and Billy Branch to record Harp Attack!, one of Alligator's best-selling albums.

Alligator years
Despite years in the business and work with Alligator, Bell's first full-length solo album for the label, Deep Down, was not released until 1995. He released a second album, Good Luck Man, for the label in 1997. Second Nature followed in 2004 (recorded in Finland a few years earlier), in which he was accompanied by his son, the guitarist Lurrie Bell (who also played guitar, along with Carl Weathersby, on Deep Down).

In 1998, Bell was awarded the Blues Music Award for Traditional Male Artist of the Year.

Final work
In 2007, Delmark Records released a live set by Bell, accompanied by a band that included his son Lurrie, the guitarist Scott Cable, Kenny Smith, Bob Stroger, and Joe Thomas.

Death
Bell died of heart failure on May 6, 2007, in Chicago.

Discography
Carey Bell's Blues Harp (Delmark, 1969)
Big Walter Horton with Carey Bell (Alligator, 1973) with Big Walter Horton
Last Night (BluesWay, 1973)
Heartaches and Pain (Delmark, 1977 [1994])
Goin' on Main Street (Evidence), 1982
Son of a Gun (Rooster Blues), 1984
Straight Shoot (Blues South West), 1986
Harpslinger (JSP), 1988
Dynasty! (JSP), 1990
Mellow Down Easy (Blind Pig), 1991
Breakdown Blues Live!, with "The Cat" (CMA), 1992
Harpmaster (JSP), 1994
Carey Bell & Spike Ravenswood (Saar), 1995
Deep Down (Alligator), 1995
Good Luck Man (Alligator), 1997
Brought Up the Hard Way (JSP CD 802), 1999
Second Nature (Alligator), 2004
Gettin' Up: Live at Buddy Guy's Legends, Rosa's and Lurrie's Home, with Lurrie Bell (Delmark), 2007

With Louisiana Red
Reality Blues (L+R), 1980
Boy from Black Bayou (L+R), 1983
My Life (L+R), 1984
Brothers in Blues (CMA Records), 1993
Live at 55 (Enja), 1994
The Blues Masters Bad Case of the Blues (Mojo Tone), 2004

Collaborations with other artists
I Feel Good! with John Lee Hooker (Carson, 1970)
I Wanna Dance All Night with John Lee Hooker (America, 1970)
2 Bugs and a Roach with Earl Hooker (Arhoolie, 1969)
Lake Michigan Ain't No River, with Bob Riedy Blues Band, 1972–1973
"Unk" in Funk with Muddy Waters (Chess, 1974)
Just Off Halsted, with Bob Riedy Blues Band (Flying Fish FF 006), 1974
Blues After Sunrise, with Heinz Sauer and Bob Degen (L+R 40017), 1980
Harp Attack!, with James Cotton, Junior Wells and Billy Branch (Alligator), 1990
Delta Bluesman, with Honeyboy Edwards (Earwig 4922), 1991
Good Candy, with Lovie Lee (Earwig 4928), 1994
You Can't Take My Blues, with Doug MacLeod (Sledgehammer Blues 2-AQM-1041), 1996
Blues Blues Blues, with the Jimmy Rogers All Stars (Atlantic), 1998
Superharps II, with Lazy Lester, Raful Neal and Snooky Pryor (Telarc), 2001
Family Album, with Wentus Blues Band (Bluelight), 2004

References

External links

"Harmonica Great Dies at 70" at NPR.org
Chicago Blues Harmonica Legend Carey Bell 1936 – 2007 (Alligator press release)
Carey Bell memorial website

 
 

1936 births
2007 deaths
Chicago blues musicians
Harmonica blues musicians
Electric blues musicians
American blues harmonica players
Blues musicians from Mississippi
20th-century American musicians
People from Macon, Mississippi
Delmark Records artists
Earwig Music artists
Blind Pig Records artists
Alligator Records artists